Lesra Martin (born April 11, 1963) is an American-Canadian lawyer, motivational speaker and writer. He is perhaps best known for helping to bring about the release of former boxer Rubin "The Hurricane" Carter.

Background
Martin was born into a troubled family in 1963. Although his family had been middle class, his parents' drinking problems and misfortunes made them move from a comfortable home in Queens, to the violent streets of Bedford–Stuyvesant and Bushwick.

Martin started to work when he was ten years old to help provide for his family. Consequently, despite his regular school attendance, he remained illiterate until he was 16 years old.

His life changed course when a group of Canadian entrepreneurs offered to help with his education in Canada after realizing his potential. He graduated high school in Ontario and received a BA (Honours) in Anthropology from the University of Toronto.  He went on to obtain a law degree from Dalhousie University. He was briefly enrolled in the doctoral program in Sociology at the University of Toronto, but left that program.  After campaigning for admittance into many of the top law programs in Canada (including the University of Toronto and Osgoode Hall (York University)), he was admitted to and joined the law program at Dalhousie University. Since then, he has practiced law as a prosecutor in Kamloops, British Columbia. Currently, he continues to practice law in Kamloops, as a civil lawyer, specializing in personal injury.

Rubin "The Hurricane" Carter
Martin is notable for his involvement in the release of former boxer, Rubin "The Hurricane" Carter in 1985 after serving almost 20 years in prison for a 1966 murder that he had nothing to do with. His involvement began after he read Carter's autobiography The Sixteenth Round. Martin wrote to Carter, in prison, in 1980 and met with him at the prison where he was incarcerated in Trenton, New Jersey. This contact resulted in the involvement of the group that Martin lived with in Toronto, in the pursuit of Carter's release. Although Carter was convicted at a retrial in 1976 and lost his appeals from that further conviction, a further proceeding was commenced in February 1985 at a federal court which resulted in his release in November that year by Judge Haddon Lee Sarokin who ruled that the case was based on racism and the withholding of evidence that could have helped Carter. The story of Carter's release including Martin's involvement, is portrayed in the film The Hurricane starring Denzel Washington although extensive portions of the account are fictionalized; Martin was portrayed in the film by Vicellous Reon Shannon.

Media appearances
Martin has appeared on The Oprah Winfrey Show, Larry King Live on CNN, and has been the subject of a National Film Board production, The Journey of Lesra Martin, directed by Cheryl Foggo.

Sources
 Soundprint.org  – The Homeboy and the Hurricane Retrieved December 2, 2006.
 Vancouver Courier, 'Film focuses on man who helped free Hurricane', August 24, 2004 Retrieved December 2, 2006.

External links
 Lesra Martin web site
 The Journey of Lesra Martin at NFB, 2002
 Movie Details, The Journey of Lesra Martin, The New York Times
 Internet Movie Database, The Journey of Lesra Martin

1963 births
African-American lawyers
African-American writers
American emigrants to Canada
American motivational speakers
Black Canadian lawyers
Canadian people of African-American descent
Lawyers in British Columbia
Living people
People from Queens, New York
Schulich School of Law alumni
People from Bushwick, Brooklyn
People from Bedford–Stuyvesant, Brooklyn
20th-century African-American people